Ponikve is a village south of Štanjel in the Municipality of Sežana in the Littoral region of Slovenia.

Name
The name Ponikve is a plural form derived from the word ponikva 'influent stream' or 'sinkhole' (into which such a stream disappears). In its plural form it refers to a gently rolling landscape consisting of the basins of an influent stream. Like other villages named Ponikve and similar names (e.g., Ponikva), it refers to a local landscape element.

Notable people
Notable people that were born or lived in Ponikve include:
 Ciril Zlobec (1925–2018), poet, journalist, and politician

References

External links

Ponikve on Geopedia

Populated places in the Municipality of Sežana

sl:Ponikve